The 2022 Segunda División RFEF play-offs (Playoffs de Ascenso or Promoción de Ascenso) were the final play-offs for promotion from 2021–22 Segunda División RFEF to the 2022–23 Primera División RFEF.

Venues
On 11 March 2022, the Province of Alicante was announced as the venue for the promotion play-off, initially the cities of Alicante and La Nucía were confirmed. On 3 May 2022, the cities of Alcoy, Benidorm and Elda were added as the other play-off venues.

Format
Twenty teams participated in the promotion play-off. Each of the five groups of the Segunda División RFEF were represented by the four teams that finished the regular season between the second and fifth positions. In the draw for the first stage, the participating teams were assigned to pots corresponding to their final regular season position. While avoiding matches between teams from the same regular season group, second-place finishers were drawn against fifth-place finishers while teams that finished third would play teams that finished fourth. The same draw process was repeated, to the extent that it would be possible, in the draw for the second round.

The five winning clubs of the second stage attained promotion to Primera RFEF and accompanied the five group champions who had already achieved their promotion.

The final two relegation spots (of 27 total) were also determined via play-offs. The four 13th-place finishers with the lowest point totals were drawn into two single-leg matches, with the winners securing survival in the Segunda División RFEF and the losers being relegated to the Tercera División RFEF. The two match-ups were selected through a random draw and hosted at a venue chosen from among the stadiums selected to host the promotion play-offs.

Promotion play-offs

Teams

Participating teams
 Arenas de Getxo
 Cacereño
 Ceuta
 Coria
 Coruxo
 Cristo Atlético
 Eldense
 Espanyol B
 Hércules
 La Nucía
 Lleida
 Mérida
 Murcia
 Navalcarnero
 Peña Deportiva
 Rayo Cantabria
 Real Sociedad C
 Sestao River
 Teruel
 Unión Adarve

Road to the play-offs

Group 1

Group 2

Group 3

Group 4

Group 5

First round

Qualified teams

Bold indicates teams that advanced to the second round

Matches

|}

Second round

Qualified teams

Matches

|}

Promoted teams
 The five teams that were or would be promoted to Primera División RFEF through regular season groups and the five play-off winners were included.
 The number of years after the last participation of the club in the third tier is referred to the previous appearance at that level, where Segunda División B was replaced by the Primera División RFEF.

Relegation play-offs

Teams

Participating teams
 Águilas
 Cerdanyola del Vallès
 Don Benito
 Gimnástica Segoviana

Road to the play-offs

Play-off

Qualified teams

Matches

|}

Relegated teams
 27 teams relegated to Tercera División RFEF: 25 teams through regular season groups and the two play-off losers.
The number of years after the last participation of the club in the fifth tier is referred to the previous appearance in the Divisiones Regionales, the divisions that were replaced by Tercera División RFEF.

References

External links
Royal Spanish Football Federation website

2021–22 Segunda División RFEF
Segunda Federación play-offs
5